Swabhimana is a 1985 Kannada-language romantic drama film directed by D. Rajendra Babu and written by K. S. Satyanarayan. The film stars V. Ravichandran and Mahalakshmi with Tiger Prabhakar and Aarathi in extended guest appearances. The soundtrack and score composition was by Shankar–Ganesh and the film was produced by B. N. Gangadhar.

Cast 
 V. Ravichandran
 Tiger Prabhakar 
 Aarathi
 Mahalakshmi
 Mukhyamantri Chandru
 Umashree
 Balakrishna
 N. S. Rao
 Shivaram
 Shanthamma
 Sujaya

Soundtrack 
The music was composed by Shankar–Ganesh, with lyrics by R. N. Jayagopal. The song "Doorada Oorinda Hammeera Banda" was received extremely well and considered one of the evergreen songs. Jayagopal won the Karnataka State Film Award for Best Lyricist for this song.

References

External links 

 Film at Youtube

1985 films
1980s Kannada-language films
Indian romantic drama films
Films scored by Shankar–Ganesh
1985 romantic drama films
Films directed by D. Rajendra Babu